Forsikringsselskapet Norge ("Insurance Company Norway") was a general insurance company based in Drammen, Norway.

History
It was founded as Brandforsikringsselskabet Norge on 9 May 1857 as a fire insurance company. The founder and first chief executive was H. F. Bang.
In 1888 he was succeeded by Alb. Mohn. From 1899 to 1919 Aage Lammers was the chief executive, and from 1919 Johs. Thv. Thomassen. Nils J. Hagerup later took over. In 1988, the company was acquired by Forenede-Gruppen (Forenede Forsikring). In 1993, Forenede Forsikring  was merged with Gjensidige Forsikring ASA.

References

External links
Gjensidige website

Insurance companies of Norway
Companies based in Drammen
Financial services companies established in 1857
Financial services companies disestablished in 1988
Norwegian companies established in 1857